Dead Cert  is a 2010 supernatural horror film written and directed by Steven Lawson.

Dead Cert is based on an idea by Garry Charles and Steven Lawson and written by Ben Shillito. Principal photography began in October 2009 and the film had a worldwide release in 2010.

In 2011 Shout! Factory released Dead Cert on DVD and Blu-ray in Region 1.

Plot

Freddy Frankham (Craig Fairbrass) thought he was out of the gangland world, a retired boxer, Freddy now owns a successful "gentlemen’s" nightclub. But when a gang of Romanian drug dealers, led by the enigmatic Dante Livienko (Billy Murray), move into London, the stakes are too good to resist one last gamble.

Cast

References

External links
 
 
 

2010 films
2010 horror films
Films set in London
British vampire films
2010s English-language films
2010s British films